The British Virgin Islands women's national football team is the national women's football team of the British Virgin Islands and is overseen by the British Virgin Islands Football Association.

Results and fixtures

The following is a list of match results in the last 12 months, as well as any future matches that have been scheduled.

Legend

2022

Players

Current squad
The following players were called up for the match against Haiti on 9 April 2022.

Recent call ups

Competitive record

FIFA Women's World Cup

*Draws include knockout matches decided on penalty kicks.

CONCACAF W Championship

*Draws include knockout matches decided on penalty kicks.

References

 
Caribbean women's national association football teams